Best of England Dan & John Ford Coley Vol. 2 is a greatest hits album by the pop rock duo England Dan & John Ford Coley.

Track listing
"What's Forever For"
"You Could've Been the One"
"I'll Stay"
"Stones (Dig a Little Deeper)"
"If the World Ran Out of Love"
"Wanting you Desperately"
"Some Things Don't Come Easy"
"Broken Hearted Me"
"Rolling Fever"
"The Prisoner"
"Where Do I Go From Here"
"Lovin' Somebody on a Rainy Night"

1981 greatest hits albums
England Dan & John Ford Coley albums
Big Tree Records albums